Junzhou or either Jun Prefecture (均州) was a zhou (prefecture) in imperial China, seated in modern Danjiangkou, Hubei, China. It existed (intermittently) between the years 585 and 1912.

Geography
The administrative region of Junzhou in the Tang dynasty is in modern Shiyan and Hubei. It probably includes parts of modern Shiyan, Danjiankou and Yun County.

References
 

Prefectures of the Tang dynasty
Prefectures of Later Tang
Prefectures of Later Liang (Five Dynasties)
Prefectures of Later Jin (Five Dynasties)
Prefectures of Later Han (Five Dynasties)
Prefectures of Later Zhou
Prefectures of the Song dynasty
Prefectures of the Sui dynasty
Prefectures of the Yuan dynasty
Subprefectures of the Ming dynasty
Departments of the Qing dynasty
Former prefectures in Hubei